Sean Black (born 13 November 1970) is a Jamaican boxer. He competed in the men's light middleweight event at the 1996 Summer Olympics.

References

External links
 

1970 births
Living people
Jamaican male boxers
Olympic boxers of Jamaica
Boxers at the 1996 Summer Olympics
Place of birth missing (living people)
Pan American Games medalists in boxing
Pan American Games bronze medalists for Jamaica
Boxers at the 1999 Pan American Games
Light-middleweight boxers
Medalists at the 1999 Pan American Games
20th-century Jamaican people
21st-century Jamaican people